Iselle di Trasquera railway station serves the village of Iselle and municipality of Trasquera, in the region of Piedmont, northwestern Italy.  Opened in 1906, the station is at the southern portal of the Simplon tunnel, on the Simplon line, between Brig, Switzerland and Domodossola, Italy.  It is also the border station between Italy and Switzerland. All rail services to and from the station are operated by BLS AG, a Swiss company.

Location

The station is situated at Via Stazione, immediately to the south of the southern portal of the Simplon Tunnel, which passes underneath the border between Switzerland and Italy.

History
The station was opened on 1 June 1906, upon the inauguration of the Brig–Domodossola railway, including the Simplon tunnel.

A monument in memory of the deceased workers of the Simplon Tunnel was erected on 29 May 1905.

Until 1929, the station was the point where locomotives were exchanged at the head of trains, because the Brig–Iselle section was operated by electric traction while trains on the Iselle–Domodossola section were powered by steam locomotives.

Services
The following services stop at Iselle di Trasquera:

Gallery

See also

History of rail transport in Italy
Rail transport in Italy
Railway stations in Italy

Notes

References

External links

 

Railway stations in the Province of Verbano-Cusio-Ossola
Railway stations opened in 1906
1906 establishments in Italy
Railway stations in Italy opened in the 20th century